Prospherysodoria is a genus of tachinid flies in the family Tachinidae.

Species
Prospherysodoria paraguayensis Townsend, 1928

Distribution
Paraguay.

References

Tachinidae genera
Exoristinae
Taxa named by Charles Henry Tyler Townsend
Diptera of South America